Riverside Station may refer to:

Train stations in the United Kingdom
Avon Riverside railway station in Bitton
Barking Riverside railway station in Barking
Beckton Riverside station in Beckton
Cardiff Riverside Junction railway station in Cardiff
Liverpool Riverside railway station in Liverpool
Matlock Riverside railway station in Matlock
Preston Riverside railway station in Preston
Tilbury Riverside railway station in Tilbury
Totnes (Riverside) railway station in Littlehempston
Windsor & Eton Riverside railway station in Windsor

Train stations in the United States
Stations in Riverside, California:
Riverside-Downtown station, an Amtrak and Metrolink station
Riverside-La Sierra station, a Metrolink station
Riverside–Hunter Park/UCR station, a Metrolink station
Riverside station (Union Pacific Railroad), a former Union Pacific Railroad station
Riverside station (Illinois) in Riverside, Illinois
Riverside station (MBTA) in Newton, Massachusetts
Riverside station (Metro-North) in Greenwich, Connecticut
Riverside station (New York) in Riparius, New York
Riverside station (OC Transpo) in Ottawa, Canada
Riverside station (River Line) in Riverside Township, New Jersey
Cedar–Riverside station in Minneapolis, Minnesota

Other
Riverside Generating Station in Dundalk, Maryland